The Josh Billings RunAground is one of the oldest triathlons, second only to Eppie's Great Race in California.  It has been held in Southern Berkshire County, Massachusetts since 1976.  The race consists of a 27 mile bike ride, 5 mile canoe/kayak sprint, and a 6.0 mile run.  The race is named after Josh Billings, whose saying "To finish is to win" has become the motto of the race.

External links
 The Great Josh Billings RunAground

Triathlon competitions
Triathlon in the United States
Recurring sporting events established in 1976
Annual sporting events in the United States
Sports competitions in Massachusetts
Tourist attractions in Berkshire County, Massachusetts
1976 establishments in Massachusetts